The South Yakutia Hydroelectric Complex or South Yakutia HPP is a set of proposed hydroelectric plants in the South Yakutia region of the Russian Far East, on rivers including the Uchur, Timpton, Aldan, and Olyokma.

Overview 
The complex will be comprise nine plants with a total capacity of over 9,000 MW, and an average annual production of about 40 billion kWh. Construction priority will be given to the Uchurskaya, Sredne-Uchurskaya, Kankunskaya, and Timptonskaya HPP's, which will have a total capacity of 5,002 MW and an annual output of 23.42 billion kWh.

Sredne-Uchurskaya HPP
Located on the River Uchur, a tributary of the Aldan River with a power generation capacity of 3330 MW, and an average annual production of 14.98 billion kWh.

Uchurskaya HPP
Hydroelectric power capacity 365 MW, average annual production 2.19 billion kWh.

Kankunskaya HPP
Power generation capacity of 1060 MW, and an average annual production of 4.77 billion kWh. It will be the first-built dam in the complex.

Timptonskaya HPP
Located on the River Timpton, a tributary of the Aldan River, Timptonskaya will have a power generation capacity of 245 MW and an annual generation of 1.48 billion kWh.

Olekminsk HPP
Located on the Olyokma River, a tributary of the Lena River. Includes Olekminsk; total capacity of 2230 MW.

Aldan HPP
Power capacity of 300 MW, average annual generation of 3.6 billion kWh. Another plant, the Verkhne Aldan, will join this station- total generation capacity is expected to be 1000 MW. Commissioning of these projects is expected in 2015–2020.

Economic importance 
The hydroelectric complex should achieve the following objectives:

♦Electricity exports to China, and possibly to South Korea, but only China has expressed interest in buying electric power from Russia.

♦Ensuring a reliable power supply to the Russian Far East oblasts.

♦Ensuring the supply of power to promising mining projects in South Yakutia, especially the Elga coal deposits.

♦Provision of electricity to energy-intensive industries, particularly aluminum smelters.

The cost of construction is estimated at $8 billion, which is less than the Diamer-Bhasha Dam in Pakistan, at $14 billion.

References

External links

Hydroelectric power stations in Russia
Proposed renewable energy power stations in Russia
Proposed hydroelectric power stations
Sakha Republic